Mongkon is a type of headgear worn by Muay Thai athletes. The Mongkhon is given to a boxer after their trainer saw that the student had become an experienced fighter and learned a great deal of knowledge about Muay Thai. The Mongkhon was never to be, in any way, close to the ground or else they believed it would lose its worth.  The Mongkhon is unique to Thai boxing and is also worn in Cambodia and Burma.

It must be worn during the Wai khru ram muay and should be only handled by the fighter and teacher, so as not to lose its perceived special powers.

Muay Thai
Kickboxing terminology